The 1924 United States Senate election in Virginia was held on November 4, 1924. Incumbent Democratic Senator Carter Glass defeated Republican W. N. Doak and was elected to his second term in office.

Results

References

External links

Virginia
1924
1924 Virginia elections